National Police Memorial may refer to:
 National Police Memorial (Australia)
 National Police Memorial (India)
 National Police Memorial (United Kingdom)

See also 
 National Law Enforcement Officers Memorial, a memorial honoring U.S. law enforcement officers who died in the line of duty